is an original net animation series produced by Gainax in collaboration with Japanese automaker  Subaru. The series was released on YouTube in four parts on February 1, 2011, with the English-subtitled version appearing six days later. An anime television series aired in Japan between April and June 2015.

Story
One day, a girl named Subaru comes across a group of magical girls, among which is her childhood friend Aoi, and becomes one herself. Their duty is to search for fragments of a spaceship belonging to an alien known as a Pleiadian. However, a mysterious boy is seeking the fragments for his own use.

Characters

Subaru is the clumsy main protagonist.

Subaru's friend, who is often worried about her attitude. 

A kind girl.

A frank girl whose father is a pianist.

A girl who is often seen wearing a black witch's outfit even outside of magical form. She has a generally monotone personality which changes when translating for the Pleiadian.

A small green alien who is searching for the scattered fragment of his spaceship engine.

A boy who resides in a mysterious greenhouse, who is also stealing the fragments of the star.

Media

Original net animation
The four-part original net animation series was created by Gainax in collaboration with car manufacturer Subaru. The series was released on YouTube on February 1, 2011, with an English subtitled version released on February 7, 2011.

Episode list

Television series
An anime television adaptation, also by Gainax, aired in Japan between April 9, 2015, and June 24, 2015, and was simulcast by Crunchyroll.

Episode list

Notes

References

External links
  (official site)  
 
 
 

2011 anime films
2011 anime ONAs
Gainax
Japanese animated films
Magical girl anime and manga
Sentai Filmworks
Subaru